NTV IC is a Bosnian local commercial television channel based in Kakanj, Bosnia and Herzegovina. The program is mainly produced in Bosnian language.

External links 
 

Television stations in Bosnia and Herzegovina
Television channels and stations established in 1994